Immo may refer to:

 2373 Immo, a main-belt asteroid
 Immo (bishop of Noyon), Frankish prelate killed by Vikings in 859
 Immobiliser